Martin Feinberg is an American chemical engineer and mathematician known for his work in chemical reaction network theory.

Life 
Born in New York, Feinberg received his undergraduate degree in chemical engineering from The Cooper Union for the Advancement of Science and Art in 1962. A year later, he obtained his master's degree from Purdue University. In 1968, he received his PhD degree from Princeton University. The subject of the doctoral thesis is fluid mechanics and the advisor is William Schowalter.
After completing the PhD, he went to work at the University of Rochester, Rochester, NY, where he was a professor of chemical engineering until 1997. He then moved to The Ohio State University, where he serves as Richard M. Morrow Professor of Chemical Engineering and Professor of Mathematics.
Feinberg was a Member of the Editorial Board of the Archive for Rational Mechanics and Analysis from 1978–1991.

Research 
Together with F. J. M. Horn and Roy Jackson, Feinberg created chemical reaction network theory, a field of mathematics that connects the graphical and algebraic structure of chemical reaction networks with their dynamic behavior. He is best known for stating and proving the deficiency zero theorem (together with Horn and Jackson) and the deficiency one theorem. He has also articulated complete necessary and sufficient conditions for detailed balancing in mass-action systems.
More recently, Feinberg has turned his attention to problems arising from biology. Together with Gheorghe Craciun, he developed the theory of injective reaction networks and explored its implications for biochemistry. A current research focus (together with Guy Shinar) is the application of chemical reaction network theory to questions of robustness in biochemical reaction networks.
He has also worked with Richard Lavine on foundations of classical thermodynamics. Feinberg is the author of "Foundations of Chemical Reaction Network Theory," published in 2019 by Springer in its Applied Mathematical Sciences series.

Selected publications 

Feinberg, M. (2019) "Foundations of Chemical Reaction Network Theory,"  Springer, Switzerland, 

Feinberg, M. and R.B. Lavine, Foundations of the Clausius-Duhem Inequality, pp. 49–64 in New Perspectives in Thermodynamics (editor James Serrin), Springer-Verlag, Berlin- Heidelberg-New York (1986).

Notes

External links 
 Feinberg, M., Lectures on Chemical Reaction Networks, written versions of Lectures 1 - 5 (out of nine) delivered at the Mathematics Research Center, University of Wisconsin, fall, 1979

Living people
1942 births
Cooper Union alumni
Purdue University College of Engineering alumni
Princeton University alumni
University of Rochester faculty
Ohio State University faculty
American chemical engineers
20th-century American mathematicians
21st-century American mathematicians